Sandy Camila Leite Macedo (born 14 April 2001) is a Brazilian taekwondo practitioner. She won the gold medal in the women's 57kg event at the 2022 South American Games held in Asunción, Paraguay. She also won the silver medal in her event at the 2021 Pan American Taekwondo Championships held in Cancún, Mexico.

In 2018, she won one of the bronze medals in the girls' 55 kg event at the Summer Youth Olympics held in Buenos Aires, Argentina. She competed in the women's featherweight event at the 2019 World Taekwondo Championships held in Manchester, United Kingdom.

In 2021, she won the gold medal in the women's 57kg event at the Junior Pan American Games held in Cali, Colombia. She has qualified to represent Brazil at the 2023 Pan American Games in Santiago, Chile.

References

External links
 

Living people
2001 births
Place of birth missing (living people)
Brazilian female taekwondo practitioners
Taekwondo practitioners at the 2018 Summer Youth Olympics
Competitors at the 2022 South American Games
South American Games gold medalists for Brazil
South American Games medalists in taekwondo
21st-century Brazilian women